A Course of Pure Mathematics is a classic textbook in introductory mathematical analysis, written by G. H. Hardy. It is recommended for people studying calculus. First published in 1908, it went through ten editions (up to 1952) and several reprints. It is now out of copyright in UK and is downloadable from various internet web sites. It remains one of the most popular books on pure mathematics.

Contents
The book contains a large number of descriptive and study materials together with a number of difficult problems with regards to number theory analysis. The book is organized into the following chapters, with each chapter further divided.

I. REAL VARIABLES

II. FUNCTIONS OF REAL VARIABLES

III COMPLEX NUMBERS

IV LIMITS OF FUNCTIONS OF A POSITIVE INTEGRAL VARIABLE

V LIMITS OF FUNCTIONS OF A CONTINUOUS VARIABLE. CONTINUOUS AND DISCONTINUOUS FUNCTIONS

VI DERIVATIVES AND INTEGRALS

VII ADDITIONAL THEOREMS IN THE DIFFERENTIAL AND INTEGRAL CALCULUS

VIII THE CONVERGENCE OF INFINITE SERIES AND INFINITE INTEGRALS

IX THE LOGARITHMIC, EXPONENTIAL AND CIRCULAR FUNCTIONS OF A REAL VARIABLE

X THE GENERAL THEORY OF THE LOGARITHMIC, EXPONENTIAL AND CIRCULAR FUNCTIONS

Appendices

INDEX

Review
The book was intended to help reform mathematics teaching in the UK, and more specifically in the University of Cambridge and in schools preparing to study higher mathematics.  It was aimed directly at "scholarship level" students – the top 10% to 20% by ability.  Hardy himself did not originally find a passion for mathematics, only seeing it as a way to beat other students, which he did decisively, and gain scholarships. However, his book excels in effectively explaining analytical number theory and calculus following the rigor of mathematics. Its publication came a year after that of Theory of Functions of a Real Variable by E.W. Hobson, which may partly have been its inspiration.

Whilst his book changed the way the subject was taught at university, the content reflects the era in which the book was written. The whole book explores number theory and the author constructs real numbers theoretically. It deals with single-variable calculus, sequences, number series, properties of cos, sin, log, etc. but does not refer to mathematical groups, multi-variable functions or vector calculus.

References

External links

Online copies
 Third edition (1921) at Internet Archive
 Third edition (1921) at Project Gutenberg
 First edition (1908) at University of Michigan Historical Math Collection

Other
 A Course of Pure Mathematics at Cambridge University Press (10 e. 1952, reissued 2008)

1908 non-fiction books
Mathematics textbooks
Mathematical analysis